Axel W. Ekblom (22 March 1893 – 26 July 1957) was a Swedish sport shooter who competed in the 1924 Summer Olympics. In 1924 he won the bronze medal with the Swedish team in the team running deer, double shots competition.

He was also a member of the Swedish trap team which finished fourth in the team clay pigeons competition. In the individual trap event he finished 16th.

References

External links
profile

1893 births
1957 deaths
Swedish male sport shooters
Running target shooters
Olympic shooters of Sweden
Shooters at the 1924 Summer Olympics
Olympic bronze medalists for Sweden
Trap and double trap shooters
Olympic medalists in shooting
Medalists at the 1924 Summer Olympics
19th-century Swedish people
20th-century Swedish people